Ukraine participated in the Junior Eurovision Song Contest 2018 in Minsk, Belarus with the song "Say Love" performed by Darina Krasnovetska. Their entrant was selected through a national selection, organized by the Ukrainian broadcaster UA:PBC.

Background

Ukraine initially withdrew from the contest on 2 July 2018 due to financial difficulties, but were ultimately added to the list of participating countries on 2 August 2018, setting a record of 20 participating countries.

Before Junior Eurovision

National final
An online public vote took place from 28 August 2018 to 3 September 2018 for users to vote for their favourite entries via UA:PBC's official website junioreurovision.ua. The winner was ultimately selected through the votes of jury members made up of music professionals, taking the results of the online voting into consideration. "Say Love" performed by Darina Krasnovetska was announced as the winner of the national final on 10 September 2018. The jury panel that selected the winner consisted of: Maria Burmaka (singer, jury chairperson), Taras Topolia (lead singer of Antytila), Oleksandra Koltsova (singer and member of the Managing Board at UA:PBC), Sofia Kutsenko (singer, Junior Eurovision Song Contest 2014 participant as part of Sympho-Nick) and Laud (singer and composer, Vidbir 2018 finalist).

Artist and song information

Darina Krasnovetska
Darina Krasnovetska (born 7 May 2007) is a Ukrainian child singer. She represented Ukraine at the Junior Eurovision Song Contest 2018 with the song "Say Love", finishing fourth.

Say Love
"Say Love" is a song by Ukrainian child singer Darina Krasnovetska. It represented Ukraine at the Junior Eurovision Song Contest 2018.

At Junior Eurovision
During the opening ceremony and the running order draw which both took place on 19 November 2018, Ukraine was drawn to perform first on 25 November 2018, preceding Portugal.

Voting

Detailed voting results

References

Junior Eurovision Song Contest
Ukraine
2018